The Miss Maine Teen USA competition is the pageant that selects the representative for the state of Maine in the Miss Teen USA pageant. The pageant is directed by The Clemente Organization.

Maine is one of the least successful states at Miss Teen USA, having placed only four times. Their highest placement was in 1995, when Katie Aselton finished 1st runner-up to Keylee Sue Sanders.

Four Maine teens have gone on to win the Miss Maine USA title, and five competed at Miss USA.

Madisson Higgins of Bangor was crowned Miss Maine Teen USA 2022 on March 20, 2022, at Portland Marriott at Sable Oaks in Portland. She will represent Maine for the title of Miss Teen USA 2022.

Results summary

Placements
1st runners-up: Katie Aselton (1995)
Top 12: Jill Mellen (1993) 
Top 15/16: Ashley Alden (2003), Alexis Mcilwain (2011), Grace Morey (2020)
Maine holds a record of 5 placements at Miss Teen USA.

Winners 

1 Age at the time of the Miss Teen USA pageant

References

External links
Official website

Maine
Women in Maine